Santa Bárbara is a town and municipality in the Colombian department of Antioquia. Part of the subregion of Southwestern Antioquia. Santa Barbara is located in a valley about 2.5 hours drive from Medellín by car or bus.

External links

References

Municipalities of Antioquia Department